Sir Emile Gumbs (18 March 1928 – 10 May 2018) was a politician from Anguilla. He served as the island territory's Chief Minister from 1 February 1977 to May 1980 and again from 12 March 1984 to 16 March 1994. 

He was the only person from Anguilla to have been knighted, having been made a Knight Bachelor in the 1994 New Year Honours. Emile Gumbs died on 10 May 2018 at the age of 90.

References

External links
 Emile Gumbs at caribbeanelections.com

1928 births
2018 deaths
Chief Ministers of Anguilla
Knights Bachelor
Politicians awarded knighthoods
People from Basseterre